M-10 highway (previously known as M-2.3 highway) is a Montenegrin roadway.

History
Construction of the Budva–Cetinje section of the highway occurred during the Interwar period.  The extension to Podgorica and further construction to bring it to highway standards occurred after World War II, and the highway was officially opened for traffic in 1978.  Since 2001, many steeper sections of the road have been upgraded with third lane, and by 2017 road has been almost fully reconstructed, with new surface, and with more than half of the highway now with three lanes instead of two. 

In January 2016, the Ministry of Transport and Maritime Affairs published bylaw on categorisation of state roads. With new categorisation, M-2.3 highway was renamed as M-10 highway.

Major intersections

References

M-10